Crime on Our Hands was a British crime drama television series which aired in 1954 on the BBC. Cast included Geraldine McEwan and Jack Watling. It aired live for six half-hour episodes. The series is missing, believed lost.

References

External links
Crime on Our Hands on IMDb

1954 British television series debuts
1954 British television series endings
1950s British drama television series
English-language television shows
British live television series
Lost television shows
Black-and-white British television shows
1950s British crime television series